Bijaneh (also Romanized as Bījāneh) is a village in Dorudfaraman Rural District, in the Central District of Kermanshah County, Kermanshah Province, Iran. At the 2006 census, its population was 670, in 145 families.

References 

Populated places in Kermanshah County